Willi Koopman was born in 1944 in the Netherlands as Willi C. Koopman. She is an actress, known for Escape to Mindanao (1968), Don't Just Stand There (1968) and It Takes a Thief (1968).

References

External links

1944 births
Living people
Dutch actresses
Date of birth missing (living people)